The Norman Manley Law School is a law school in Jamaica.

Building and location
The Norman Manley Law School is located on the Mona campus of the University of the West Indies, yet it is a distinct and separate institution. Its building, designed by architect firm Rutkowski, Bradford & Partners, is noted as an example of Caribbean modernist architecture. It was badly damaged by Hurricane Gilbert in September 1988; a clerestory window broke and let the wind into the building, placing significant uplift pressure on the roof deck.

History
Named for Jamaican statesman Norman Manley, NMLS is one of three law schools empowered by the (Caribbean) Council of Legal Education to award Legal Education Certificates, along with the Eugene Dupuch Law School in the Bahamas and the Hugh Wooding Law School in Trinidad and Tobago. It opened its doors to students in September 1973. In July 2008, former Deputy Solicitor General Stephen Vasciannie was appointed principal of NMLS, succeeding Keith Sobion who had died some months before. In November 2012, Carol Aina was appointed principal following Vasciannie's departure to take up the post of Jamaica's ambassador to the United States.

Partnerships and outreach work
NMLS students are required to perform several hours of field work to graduate. One way they obtain these hours is by participating in legal clinics, through which the needy can obtain legal consultations at a price of J$1,000, far less than the usual tens of thousands of dollars required to meet with a private lawyer. In November 2008, NMLS signed a memorandum of understanding with the Inter-American Commission on Human Rights to form a partnership and hold seminars on human rights issues, including capital punishment.

Notable students and faculty

Kirk Anderson, Justice of the Supreme Court of Jamaica
Dean Barrow, fourth Prime Minister of Belize
George Brown, Chief Justice of Belize from 1990 to 1998
Zaila McCalla, Chief Justice of Jamaica
Michel Chebat, former chairman of the Social Security Board of Belize and president of the Bar Association of Belize
Troadio Gonzalez, justice of the Supreme Court of Belize
Lindsay Grant, former Leader of the People's Action Movement of Saint Kitts and Nevis
Burton P. C. Hall, Bahamian judge who sits on the International Criminal Tribunal for the Former Yugoslavia
Cheryl Krusen, Solicitor-General of Belize
Jody-Anne Maxwell, first non-U.S. winner of the Scripps National Spelling Bee
 Ann-Marie Smith, Chief Magistrate of Belize
Lisa Shoman, Belizean lawyer and politician
George Singh, Chief Justice of Belize in 1998
Manuel Sosa, President of the Belize Court of Appeal, former Chief Justice
Rodwell Williams (1984), Dean Barrow's partner at Barrow and Williams in Belize
Dame Janice Pereira, Chief Justice of the Eastern Caribbean Supreme Court

See also 

 University of the West Indies
 Legal education
 Law degree
 List of law schools
 Caribbean Law Institute

References

Law in the Caribbean
Educational institutions established in 1973
Buildings and structures in Saint Andrew Parish, Jamaica
Universities in Jamaica
1973 establishments in Jamaica